Aly Michalka (born March 25, 1989) is an American actress, singer-songwriter and musician who rose to prominence with her starring role as Keely Teslow in the Disney Channel sitcom Phil of the Future (2004–2006). Aly Michalka went on to appear in various films, such as Bandslam (2009), Easy A (2010), The Roommate (2011), Grown Ups 2 (2013), Sequoia (2014), Weepah Way for Now (2015), and The Lears (2017). She had starring roles in The CW comedy drama series Hellcats (2010–2011) and the CW crime drama series iZombie (2015–2019), along with the Hallmark Channel Original Movie, Sand Dollar Cove (2021).

She is half of the musical duo Aly & AJ (briefly 78violet), alongside her sister AJ Michalka.

Early life
Michalka was born in Torrance, California. She grew up in Seattle, Washington, and Southern California with her younger sister, Amanda Joy "AJ", who is also an actress and musician. Her father, Mark, owns a contracting company, and her mother, Carrie, is a musician who performed with the Christian rock band "JC Band". Her parents are divorced.

Michalka has played the piano since she was five and started playing the guitar at the age of 13. She started acting when she was five years old in church play productions. She was raised as a Christian.

Career

Acting 
In 2004, Michalka was cast in the role of Keely Teslow on the Disney Channel's Phil of the Future. The series premiered on June 18, 2004. In August 2006, Disney Channel ended the series after two seasons. She has also starred in the Disney Channel original movie Now You See It..., and appeared in the TV movie Cow Belles opposite her sister. Michalka and her sister starred in several projects produced by the Disney Channel and MTV. In 2007, they appeared in the MTV film Super Sweet 16: The Movie based on the MTV series My Super Sweet 16. In August 2009, she co-starred in the Walden Media film Bandslam. In April 2010, The CW announced Michalka was cast in the main role of Marti Perkins on the cheerleading drama series Hellcats. Despite a successful premiere, ratings dropped, and in May 2011, The CW announced the show was not renewed for a second season. In 2011, Michalka made a guest appearance on CSI: NY. In 2010 and 2011 respectively, Michalka had major supporting roles in films Easy A and The Roommate. In 2013, Michalka appeared in the independent drama film, Crazy Kind of Love, alongside Eva Longoria, Virginia Madsen and Amanda Crew.

In 2013, Michalka participated in a multi-episode role on the sitcom Two and a Half Men. In July 2014, she and her sister filmed the independent drama Weepah Way for Now in Laurel Canyon, California; Michalka also participated in the casting process and production for the film. The movie was written and directed by her husband, Stephen Ringer, and premiered at the Los Angeles Film Festival on June 16, 2015. Michalka had a recurring role on the CW series iZombie for the first and second season, and became a regular cast member for season three. On April 19, 2016, she was announced as a cast member for the comedy film The Lears, an adaptation based on the Shakespearean play King Lear.

Music 

Michalka and her sister AJ formed the musical duo Aly & AJ in 2004. They released their first album, Into the Rush, on August 16, 2005. In September 2006, they released a holiday album, Acoustic Hearts of Winter, featuring cover songs and two original songs. In July 2007, their third album, Insomniatic, was released, featuring the Billboard top 20 hit single, "Potential Breakup Song". The duo changed their name to 78violet and were set to release a fourth album in early 2010, but the project never materialized following their departure from Hollywood Records. Several years later, in the summer of 2013, they returned with new music, releasing their first single, "Hothouse", on July 8, 2013. In December 2015, they confirmed that they had returned to their original name, "Aly & AJ". In April 2016, they confirmed plans to release new music for an upcoming studio album.
On June 2, 2017, they announced a new single, titled "Take Me". It served as the lead single from their EP, planned to be released on July 14, 2017. On May 7, 2021, they released A Touch of the Beat Gets You Up on Your Feet Gets You Out and Then Into the Sun.

Personal life
In 2013, Michalka began dating independent film producer Stephen Ringer, whom she met on the set of her film Sequoia. The couple became engaged at Big Sur, California, in July 2014. They married in a small ceremony in Portofino, Italy, on June 6, 2015.

Filmography

Film

Television

Web

Discography

Awards and nominations

References

External links 

 

1989 births
Living people
Aly & AJ
21st-century American actresses
21st-century American women singers
Actors from Torrance, California
Actresses from California
Actresses from Seattle
American child actresses
American child singers
American Christians
American women pop singers
American women singer-songwriters
American film actresses
American television actresses
American women guitarists
Musicians from Seattle
Musicians from Torrance, California
Guitarists from California
Guitarists from Washington (state)
Singer-songwriters from California
Hollywood Records artists
21st-century American singers
Singer-songwriters from Washington (state)